The Sérsic profile (or Sérsic model or Sérsic's law) is a mathematical function that describes how the intensity  of a galaxy varies with distance  from its center. It is a generalization of de Vaucouleurs' law.  José Luis Sérsic first published his law in 1963.

Definition

The Sérsic profile has the form

The parameter , called the "Sérsic index," controls the degree of curvature of the profile (see figure).
and the shallower (steeper) the logarithmic slope at small (large) radii is: 

Today, it is more common to write this function in terms of the half-light radius, Re, and the intensity at that radius, Ie, such that 

Many related expressions, in terms of the surface brightness, also exist.

Applications

Most galaxies are fit by Sérsic profiles with indices in the range 1/2 < n < 10.
The best-fit value of n correlates with galaxy size and luminosity, such that bigger and brighter galaxies tend to be fit with larger n.
  

Setting n = 4 gives the de Vaucouleurs profile:

which is a rough approximation of ordinary elliptical galaxies.
Setting n = 1 gives the exponential profile:

which is a good approximation of spiral galaxy disks and a rough approximation of dwarf elliptical galaxies.  The correlation of Sérsic index (i.e. galaxy concentration) with galaxy morphology is sometimes used in automated schemes to determine the Hubble type of distant galaxies.  Sérsic indices have also been shown to correlate with the mass of the supermassive black hole at the centers of the galaxies. 

Sérsic profiles can also be used to describe dark matter halos, where the Sérsic index correlates with halo mass.

Generalizations of the Sérsic profile 

The brightest elliptical galaxies often have low-density cores that are not well described by Sérsic's law.  The core-Sérsic family of models was introduced
 to describe such galaxies.  Core-Sérsic models have an additional set of parameters that describe the core. 

Dwarf elliptical galaxies and bulges often have point-like nuclei that are also not well described by Sérsic's law. These galaxies are often fit by a Sérsic model with an added central component representing the nucleus.

See also 

 Elliptical galaxy
 Galactic bulge

References

External links 
Stellar systems following the R exp 1/m luminosity law A comprehensive paper that derives many properties of Sérsic models.
A Concise Reference to (Projected) Sérsic R1/n Quantities, Including Concentration, Profile Slopes, Petrosian Indices, and Kron Magnitudes.

Astrophysics